Sallum (  various transliterations include El Salloum, As Sallum or Sollum) is a harbourside village or town in Egypt. It is along the Egypt/Libyan short north–south aligned coast of the Mediterranean Sea in the far northwest corner of Egypt.

Sallum is mainly a Bedouin community of the families of merchants, fishermen and herdsmen. It has little tourist activity and few organized historical curiosities. It is a key trading center for the local Bedouin community.

Sallum is on its own pass, improved since World War II, has become the main pass ascending the related ridge, which obstructs east–west trade. This escarpment is the ʿAqaba al-Kabīr, once called the ʿAqaba as-Sallūm, such as in the 12th century – a descriptor meaning graded (evened out) ascent, then making the name of the town. There are no other roadworthy passes nearby.

Sallum was a small ancient Roman port. Some Roman wells remain locally. Sometimes called Baranis, it should not be confused with the medieval-noted branch of the Berbers, the al-Baranis.

At its southern end scattered homes mark out the end of the northern coast of Egypt. Amenities include a post office and a National Bank of Egypt branch.

History

Early settlement
Local people are mentioned in some Roman accounts of Catabathmus Maior/Magnus (referring to the local, obstructive ridge to east–west land trade, ʿAqaba as-Sallūm or more commonly today ʿAqaba al-Kabīr, literally 'the great pass.' It may have been Plynos Limen and Tetrapyrgia mentioned in less context-clear early courses.

Sallum was the origin for many eastward migrations to Egypt Eyalet and Bilad al-Sham. During the 19th century, one family, migrated first to Tafilah in southern Jordan, and thence to the region of Jaffa. They settled in ancient village of Mulabbis, and lived there for several generations until the establishment of Petah Tikva, the first Zionist colony, in 1878

Sovereignty and battles
Sallum was part of the Eyalet then Vilayet of Tripolitania, 1551–1911, the year before its fall mainly to Italy. That year, during the Italo-Turkish War, an Anglo-Egyptian force took over it, relieving its garrison, to prevent it from falling into Italian hands. When the border between Italian Libya and Egypt was settled by treaty in 1925, Sallum was left on the Egyptian side.

During the Senussi Campaign of World War I, Sallum was captured by the Senussi in November 1915 with Ottoman and German assistance. It was re-taken by the British in March 1916.

In December 1941, during Operation Crusader in World War II (and the two other operations affecting nearby Halfaya Pass) Sallum was the location of fighting between the British Empire and allied Commonwealth forces against German forces; the latter were retreating from gains they had made deeper into Egypt. The Halfaya Sollum War Cemetery was established by the Commonwealth War Graves Commission to inter over 2,000 soldiers who died in the region.

On July 21, 1977, Libya attacked Sallum, initiating the first clash in the Libyan-Egyptian War.

Solar eclipse
Sallum was a destination in the total solar eclipse on March 29, 2006 among expeditions.

Climate
Köppen-Geiger climate classification system classifies its climate, like almost all of Egypt, as hot desert (BWh). However, typically for the northern coast, Sallum has its temperatures moderated by blowing winds from the Mediterranean Sea.

See also
Halfaya Pass
Military history of Italy during World War II
Military history of Egypt during World War II
Egyptian–Libyan War

Notes

External links
Photograph of twilight Sidi Barrani solar eclipse (Oct. 2005, copyright 2005-2007 Magyar Csillagászati Egyesület): Hungarian-foto Sidi-twilight (540x345, 38 KB).
Photograph of solar eclipse at Sidi Barrani (Oct. 2005, copyright 2005-2007 Magyar Csillagászati Egyesület): Hungarian-foto Sidi-eclipse (9 kb).
Photograph of Sidi Barrani observers (Oct. 2005, copyright 2005-2007 Magyar Csillagászati Egyesület): Hungarian-foto Sidi-people (50 kb).

Egypt–Libya border crossings
Populated places in Matrouh Governorate